Miguel Jerónimo de Cieza (1611-1685) was a Spanish painter.

Jerónimo de Cieza was born at Granada, and was a scholar of Alonso Cano, whom he imitated both in drawing and in colour. He painted historical pictures, and according to Palomino, his best works are in the Convent of the Angel, and in the
Hospital of the Corpus Domini, at Granada. He died in Granada in 1685.

His son was José de Cieza.

Notes

References

 Cazorla Garcia, Cristina, "Life of the Virgin in the Granada School of painting (iconographic study) ', Journal of Art and Iconography, FUE, t. XI, No. 22 (2002), p. 207-399.
 Cean Bermudez, John Augustine, Historical Dictionary of the most distinguished teachers of the Fine Arts in Spain, Madrid, 1800, vol 1, p. 131.
 Pérez Sánchez, Alfonso E. (1992). Baroque Painting in Spain 1600–1750. Madrid: Ediciones Chair. .

Attribution:
 

1611 births
1685 deaths
People from Granada
17th-century Spanish painters
Spanish male painters